Cucullia praecana is a moth belonging to the family Noctuidae. The species was first described by Eduard Friedrich Eversmann in 1844.

It is native to Northern Europe.

References

Cucullia